Zhou Guohua (born 10 October 1990) is a visually impaired Paralympian athlete from China competing mainly in T12 classification sprint events. In London in 2012 she became the T12 record holder at 100m.

Life
Zhou was born in Ulanqab in Inner Mongolia in 1990 with poor eyesight. She was discovered in Dongguan in 2009 where she was working as a masseuse. Luo Jinhui from the local disable association identified her athletic stature and suggested she could make a better living as an athlete. By 2011 she was able to become a professional after taking medals at the national paragames. She did not compete a lot in international events until just before the 2012 Paralympics where she took two gold medals in Croatia at 100 and 200 metres.

Zhou won two medals at her first Summer Paralympics, the 2012 London Games, including the gold medal in the women's 100m sprint. Here she set a new world record of 12.05 seconds in the T12 event. The time was so quick that this would place her in the top women in the world irrespective of her disability. She is also a World Championships and Asian Games medalists, winning five medals over four tournaments. At the 2014 Asian Para Games she set an Asian record in the 400m T12 sprint with a time of 58.45.

Notes

External links
 

1990 births
Paralympic athletes of China
Athletes (track and field) at the 2012 Summer Paralympics
Athletes (track and field) at the 2016 Summer Paralympics
Paralympic gold medalists for China
Paralympic silver medalists for China
Paralympic bronze medalists for China
Living people
Chinese female sprinters
Medalists at the 2012 Summer Paralympics
Medalists at the 2016 Summer Paralympics
People from Ulanqab
Runners from Inner Mongolia
World Para Athletics Championships winners
Paralympic medalists in athletics (track and field)
Athletes (track and field) at the 2020 Summer Paralympics
20th-century Chinese women
21st-century Chinese women